Anatomy of a Marriage: My Days with Françoise (Jean-Marc ou La vie conjugale) is a 1964 French film directed by André Cayatte telling the story of a marriage break-up told from the man's point of view.

The film is also known as Anatomy of a Marriage: My Nights With Francoise.

The film's companion piece Anatomy of a Marriage: My Days with Jean-Marc tells the story from the woman's point of view.

Cast 
Marie-José Nat as Françoise Dubreuil
Jacques Charrier as Jean-Marc Dubreuil
Michel Subor as Roger
Macha Méril as Nicole
Alfred Adam as Fernand Aubry
Giani Esposito as Ettore
Jacques Monod as Rouquier
Yves Vincent as Granjouan
Blanchette Brunoy as Suzanne Aubry
Jacqueline Porel as Line
Jean-Henri Chambois as The President
Rosita Fernández as The Maid
 as Mme Monier
Yvan Chiffre as Christian
Corinne Armand as Christine
Albert Dinan
Sybil Saulnier as Danièle
Michèle Girardon as Patricia
Georges Rivière as Philippe

Soundtrack

Reception 
In a joint review of the two films, Bosley Crowther of The New York Times wrote that the two main actors "skillfully [portrayed] the characteristics of nobility and selflessness or pettiness and shame" but that "the two main characters in these films are distinctly commonplace people, inadequate to responsibility, immature and hardly worth the exceptional attention that is given to them".

References

External links 

1964 films
Films directed by André Cayatte
French drama films
1960s French-language films
French black-and-white films
1964 drama films
1960s French films